Stephen R. Wise was a Republican member of the Florida Senate, who served the 6th District from Sept 25, 2001 to November 5, 2002, and the 5th district from November 5, 2002, to November 6, 2012 . Wise was born in Canton, Ohio on December 11, 1941. He currently resides in Jacksonville, Florida. Previously he was a member of the Florida House of Representatives for the 14th district from November 8, 1988, to November 3, 1992, and the 13th district from November 3, 1992, through November 7, 2000.

References

External links

Florida State Legislature - Senator Stephen R. Wise
Project Vote Smart - Senator Stephen R. Wise (FL) profile
Follow the Money - Stephen R. Wise
2006 2004 2002 1998 campaign contributions

|-

|-

|-

Republican Party Florida state senators
Republican Party members of the Florida House of Representatives
1941 births
Living people
Baptists from Florida
Baptists from Ohio
21st-century Baptists
20th-century Baptists